Stars Falling From the Sky (also known as Wish Upon a Star) is a 2010 South Korean television drama broadcast on SBS.

Plot
Jin Pal-gang (Choi Jung-won) has worked at an insurance firm for five years, but she spends more than she makes and has racked up credit card debt. Loud-mouthed and rash, she has a pretty immature personality despite her 25 years of age and her life's greatest goal is to find a handsome, perfect man and live in married bliss. But she suddenly becomes the guardian for her five younger adopted siblings when her parents pass away.

Won Kang-ha (Kim Ji-hoon) is Pal-gang's co-worker and romantic interest, a sharp insurance company lawyer who was abandoned as a child and has trouble opening up to others - until he meets Pal-gang and her siblings.

Cast
Jin family
Choi Jung-won as Jin Pal-gang
Park Ji-bin as Jin Joo-hwang
Kim Yoo-ri as Jin No-rang
Joo Ji-won as Jin Cho-rok
Chun Bo-geun as Jin Pa-rang
Lee Young-bum as Jin Sae-yoon
Yu Ji-in as Na Joo-soon

Won family
Kim Ji-hoon as Won Kang-ha
Shin Dong-wook as Won Joon-ha
Lee Kyun as Woo Tae-gyu

Jung family
Chae Young-in as Jung Jae-young
Lee Soon-jae as Jung Gook 
Kim Kyu-chul as Jung In-goo
Jung Ae-ri as Lee Min-kyung

Extended cast
Lee Doo-il as Kim Jang-soo
Park Hyun-sook as Han Jin-joo
Kim Ji-young as Choi Eun-mal
Jang Jung-hee as Pal-gang's office supervisor
Joo Ho as grocery lady's son
Seo Young as Min-ah
Na Hae-ri as secretary
Jo Won-suk
Min Ji-oh
Jun Jin-gi

Trivia
The Jin siblings are named after colors in the Korean language. 
ppal-gang = red
joo-hwang = orange
no-rang = yellow
cho-rok = green
pa-rang = blue
nam-i = indigo

Soundtrack

Stars Falling from the Sky is the soundtrack album for the television series. It was released on January 25, 2010 by Chili Music, distributed by M.net. The title song, "Stars Falling from the Sky," was released as a digital single on January 12, 2010. That song is performed by the South Korean girl group Kara.

Track listing

References

External links
 Official website 
 

Seoul Broadcasting System television dramas
2010 South Korean television series debuts
2010 South Korean television series endings
Korean-language television shows
South Korean romantic comedy television series